The German Hospital Tirana is a hospital in Tirana, Albania.

About the German Hospital
The German Hospital Tiran cooperates with the largest Cardiac Clinics in the world.
The Center of Cardiovascular Care is the best and largest in Albania and the Balkan countries, with German and Austrian doctors and a highly trained and motivated international medical support team.
The doctors and surgeons of the German Hospital have performed over 1,000 cardiovascular interventions per year, using state-of-the-art and latest technology - including modern minimal invasive and less traumatic techniques.

Departments
 Anaesthesia,
 Cardiac Surgery,
 Cardiology,
 Intensive Care Medicine,
 Radiology,
 Laboratory,
 Out-Patient Department,

Services
The cardiac surgery program at The German Hospital in Tirana
is offering a full range of services and surgical interventions.

Cardiac Surgery

Apart from routine they are also specialized in 
 Physiological repair of mitral heart valves,
 Advanced coronary artery bypass surgery,
 Advanced aortic valve surgery,
 Thoracic aneurysm interventions,

Cardiology

The cardiology team offers 
 Modern state-of-the-art invasive and non-invasive cardiological diagnostic procedures,
 Executive Health Programs for individual Health Check-up,
 Risc factor management - Diabetes and Hypertension screening,
 Screening, diagnosis and treatment of coronary artery disease, valve disease and heart rhythm disorders,

Career
Currently the German Hospital is searching for doctors.
Open positions are:
 Cardiologist (Chief & Consultant - interventional & non-interventional cardiology),
 Anesthesist (Consultant - cardiovascular anesthsist),
 ICU nurses (Cardiovascular Intensive Care),

References

Buildings and structures in Tirana
Hospitals in Albania